Lower Bodinnar is a hamlet in the parish of Sancreed (where the 2011 census population was included.), Cornwall, England, UK.

References

Hamlets in Cornwall